Callidula evander is a moth in the family Callidulidae. It is found on Sulawesi.

References

Moths described in 1780
Callidulidae